Pingasa nobilis is a moth of the family Geometridae first described by Louis Beethoven Prout in 1913. It is found in New Guinea and Queensland, Australia.

Adults have mottled grey wings with scalloped edges. The margins have broad brown borders, each with one grey patch. There are two dark zigzag lines across the forewings and one across the hindwings.

Subspecies
Pingasa nobilis nobilis
Pingasa nobilis furvifrons Prout, 1927

References

Pseudoterpnini
Moths described in 1913
Taxa named by Louis Beethoven Prout